Arinzo is a 2013 Nigerian film produced by Iyabo Ojo. Ghollywood and Nollywood actors were featured in the film, and it was shot in both Ghana and Nigeria.

Synopsis 
The movie is about two sisters who have a good relationship but later become enemies as one is a police officer while the other is involved in robberies.

Cast 
 Vivienne Achor 
 Blankson
 Ekson Smith Asante
 Anthar Laniyan
 Femi  Branch
 Yinka Quadri
 Muka Ray
 Ayo Mogaji
 Bukky Wright
 Doris  Simeon
 Iyabo Ojo

Awards 
Iyabo Ojo was nominated for the YMAA award as the leading actor.

See also 
 Toyin Abraham
 Liz Da-Silva

References 

2013 films
Nigerian drama films